Pharsalia is a genus of longhorn beetles of the subfamily Lamiinae, containing the following species:

subgenus Antennopharsalia
 Pharsalia antennata Gahan, 1895
 Pharsalia jaccoudi Breuning, 1982

subgenus Cycos
 Pharsalia subgemmata (Thomson, 1857)

subgenus Eopharsalia
 Pharsalia biplagiata Breuning, 1950
 Pharsalia clara Breuning, 1940
 Pharsalia claroides Breuning, 1958
 Pharsalia granulipennis Breuning & de Jong, 1941
 Pharsalia implagiata Breuning, 1950
 Pharsalia indica Breuning, 1960
 Pharsalia nicobarica Breuning, 1970

subgenus Pharsalia
 Pharsalia andoi Hayashi, 1975
 Pharsalia borneensis Breuning, 1936
 Pharsalia cameronhighlandica Hayashi, 1975
 Pharsalia cincticornis Pascoe, 1866
 Pharsalia dunni Breuning, 1972
 Pharsalia duplicata Pascoe, 1866
 Pharsalia gibbifera (Guérin-Méneville, 1844)
 Pharsalia lentiginosa Pascoe, 1866
 Pharsalia malasiaca Thomson, 1864
 Pharsalia matangensis Breuning, 1958
 Pharsalia mortalis (Thomson, 1857)
 Pharsalia obliquemaculata Breuning, 1936
 Pharsalia ochreomaculata Breuning, 1968
 Pharsalia ochreopunctata Fuchs, 1957
 Pharsalia ochreostictica Breuning, 1938
 Pharsalia patrona (Pascoe, 1859)
 Pharsalia philippinensis Breuning, 1936
 Pharsalia proxima Gahan, 1890
 Pharsalia pulchra Gahan, 1888
 Pharsalia saperdoides Pascoe, 1866
 Pharsalia setulosa Aurivillius, 1920
 Pharsalia strandi Breuning, 1936
 Pharsalia supposita Pascoe, 1866
 Pharsalia suturalis Aurivillius, 1920
 Pharsalia thibetana Breuning, 1982
 Pharsalia tonkinensis Breuning, 1936
 Pharsalia truncatipennis Heller, 1915
 Pharsalia variegata Aurivillius, 1920

References

 
Lamiini